Mahindra Sanyo Special Steel Private Limited  or formerly known as Mahindra Ugine Steel (MUSCO) is a manufacturer of specialty steel, stampings, and rings headquartered in Mumbai, India. It is a joint venture of the Mahindra Group, one of India's largest industrial houses and Sanyo Special Steel Co. Ltd and Mitsui & Co. Ltd from Japan  

MUSCO has three stampings facilities located near key automotive clusters in India: Kanhe to serve the manufacturing cluster in Pune; Nashik; and Rudrapur to serve Northern India.  Together, MUSCO has a total stampings capacity of 30,000 metric tons per year.  Its ring rolling division also has a total capacity of 30,000 metric tons.  It was the first steel company in India to receive an ISO 9001:2000 Certificate in 2002 and in 2005, it received ISO TS 16949 certification.

History
MUSCO was incorporated on 19 December 1962 in Mumbai. It began as a dealership/seller of tool, alloy, and specialty steels. In 1964, MUSCO was first listed on Mumbai Stock Exchange.

Awards
 ISO/TS 16949 : 2002 Certification by RWTUV (Germany) in August 2005. 
 AD 2000 WO Certification of a QM System according to Pressure Equipment Directive: 97/23/EC, from RWTUV (Germany). 
 Lloyd’s Register, London for Steels used in Ship Building. 
 Well-Known Steel Maker Certification by Central Boilers Board for Creep Resistant Steel under IBR 1950. 
 Certification for Registration of In-House R&D Unit by Ministry of Science & Technologies, Government of India. 
 National Award by Ministry of Defence, Government of India for Development of Steels for Aircraft. 
 Awarded Best Alloy Plant in India by Indian Institute of Metals in 1995. 
 Vikram Sarabhai Space Research Centre for High Temperature Steels for Space Applications. 
 Hindustan Aeronautics Limited for MIG Supersonic Aircraft Components (Recipient of National Award). 
 Siemens (Germany) for High Temperature Steels for Turbines. 
 Cummins Award as "Ship To Use" Supplier. 
 Caterpillar for supply of high quality steel bars.

References

External links
Mahindra Ugine Steel Company to set up new manufacturing unit in Pantnagar
Mahindra Systech to sell stake in Mahindra Ugine Steel
Mahindra Ugine Steel to set up new unit in Pantnagar

Steel companies of India
Mahindra Group
Manufacturing companies based in Mumbai
Manufacturing companies established in 1962
1962 establishments in Maharashtra
Indian companies established in 1962
Companies listed on the Bombay Stock Exchange